Mayapur is a neighbourhood of Bamanpukur, in the Nabadwip CD block in the Krishnanagar Sadar subdivision of the Nadia district in the state of West Bengal, India. It is situated adjacent to Nabadwip, at the confluence of two rivers, where the waters of the Jalangi River mix with Bhagirathi, a distributary of the Ganges. It is located about 130 km north of Kolkata. Along with Nabadwip, it is considered a spiritual place by the adherents of Gaudiya Vaishnavism.

Etymology 
The word Mayapur derives from Miyapur, the Bengali name of a village, known as Muslim-inhabited village, specially for the settlement of Muslim fishermen. The name Miyapur was mentioned in various government documents, including maps and surveys. In the 20th century, the Gaudiya Vaishnava reformer Bhaktivinoda Thakur proclaimed this place as Mayapur.

History

It is said to be the birthplace of Chaitanya Mahaprabhu. It is said that Krishna appeared along with his brother Balarama, as Chaitanya Mahaprabhu and Nityananda Prabhu. These two brothers appeared just for the fallen conditioned souls of this Kali Yuga to bestow on them the greatest blessings of Harinama Sankirtan based on the teachings of Bhagvad Gita and Shrimad Bhagavatam. Along with their associates, the Pancha Tattva, they distributed the divine Love of Godhead to anyone and everyone without seeing any qualifications or disqualifications. Mayapur is where the Material and Spiritual Worlds meet. Just as there is no difference between Lord Chaitanya and Lord Krishna, similarly there is no difference between Shridham Mayapur and Vrindavan.

Gaudiya Vaishnava temples and memorials

There are a number of Gaudiya Vaishnava organizations in Mayapur. The headquarters of the International Society for Krishna Consciousness (ISKCON) is situated in Mayapur. The town is heavily centered on this particular Vaishnava religious tradition with temples devoted to Radha and Krishna or Gaura-Nitai throughout.

In the 1880s, at the birthsite of Chaitanya Mahaprabhu, Bhaktivinoda Thakur established the Yogapith temple, a white ornate structure with a pyramidal pointed dome standing on the bank of a pond and surrounded by trees.

The main attraction in Mayapur is the Temple of Vedic Planetarium built by ISKCON which is the world's largest temple. Also there is Srila Prabhupada's Pushpa Samadhi Mandir, a memorial to ISKCON's founder. The main shrine is surrounded by a museum depicting Srila Prabhupada's life, using fiberglass exhibits. Mayapur Chandrodaya Mandir or the main temple has 3 main altars, Sri Sri Radha Madhava, Panca-tattva and Lord Narasimha Deva. These Pancha Tattva deities are the largest deities of Pancha Tattva in the world. The Panca-tattva comprises Sri Chaitanya Mahaprabhu, Nityananda Prabhu, Advaita Acharya, Gadadhara Pandit, and Srivas Thakur.

The Gaudiya-Vaishnava devotees every year circumambulate the various places of Lord Chaitanya's pastimes in the group of nine islands known as Navdvip. This Parikrama takes about 7 days. This event takes place around the Gaur Purnima Festival (Appearance Day of Lord Chaitanya). Devotees from all over the world come to Mayapur for this auspicious Parikrama to celebrate the Lord's Divine Appearance Day.

Transport
Kolkata is about 100 km from Mayapur. The nearest airport is Netaji Subhas Chandra Bose International Airport which is around 86 km (53 mi). It can easily be accessed through roads. Although there is no proper rail connectivity. But it can be reached through Nabadwip Dham station.

Gallery

See also
 Nabadwip
 Nrisingha Temple, Nadia
 Nityananda
 Vrindavan

Footnotes

References

External links

 Yoga-Pitha - Holy birthplace of Shri Chaitanya Mahaprabhu
 Mayapur in photos & video clips
 Sri Mayapur Dham, ISKCON Mayapur main site
 ISKCON Mayapur Design Archive
 Murtis in ISKCON Mayapur
 Mayapur/Navadvipa
 MayaPur Dham Yatra
 

Cities and towns in Nadia district
Hindu holy cities
International Society for Krishna Consciousness
Vaishnavism
Tourist attractions in Nadia district